Nicholas David Green OAM (born 4 October 1967) is an Australian former rower, a dual Olympic gold medallist and four time World Champion. From 1990 to 1998 he was a member of Australia's prominent world class crew – the coxless four known as the Oarsome Foursome. Now a sports administrator, since 2014 he has been Chief Executive of Cycling Australia.

Rowing career
Educated at Xavier College in Kew, Melbourne and at Melbourne High School, Green competed in two Olympic Games — 1992 Summer Olympics and 1996 Summer Olympics, winning gold medals at each in the "Oarsome Foursome".

Accolades
He was one of the eight flag-bearers of the Olympic Flag at the opening ceremony of the 2000 Sydney Olympics.

He was awarded the Medal of the Order of Australia in 1993 for services to rowing and the Australian Sports Medal in 2000. In 2010 Green was inducted as a member of the Rowing Victoria Hall of Fame.

Sports administrator
In 2008 Nick was appointed as director of game and industry development for Golf Australia.

He was appointed the Chef de mission for the Australian team at the 2012 Olympic Games.

In September 2014 he was appointed as Chief Executive of Cycling Australia.

Achievements
 Olympic Medals: 2 Gold
 World Championship Medals: 4 Gold

Olympic Games
 1996 – Gold, Coxless Four (with James Tomkins, Drew Ginn, Mike McKay)
 1992 – Gold, Coxless Four (with James Tomkins, Andrew Cooper, Mike McKay)

World Championships
 1998 – Gold, Coxed Four (with James Tomkins, Mike Mckay, Drew Ginn and Brett Hayman (cox))
 1998 – Gold, Coxed Pair (with James Tomkins and Brett Hayman (cox))
 1995 – 5th, Coxless Four (with James Tomkins, Drew Ginn, Mike McKay)
 1991 – Gold, Coxless Four (with James Tomkins, Andrew Cooper, Mike McKay)
 1990 – Gold, Coxless Four (with James Tomkins, Sam Patten, Mike McKay)

References

External links
 Golf Australia, official site

1967 births
Living people
Australian male rowers
Olympic rowers of Australia
Rowers at the 1992 Summer Olympics
Rowers at the 1996 Summer Olympics
Olympic gold medalists for Australia
Rowers from Melbourne
People educated at Xavier College
People educated at Melbourne High School
Olympic medalists in rowing
World Rowing Championships medalists for Australia
Medalists at the 1996 Summer Olympics
Medalists at the 1992 Summer Olympics
Sport Australia Hall of Fame inductees